This article refers to crime in the U.S. state of Montana.

Statistics
 there were 28,397 crimes reported in Montana, including 22 murders.

Capital punishment laws

Capital punishment was applied in this state up to 2015, when it was suspended for lack of any available drug for lethal injection which met the legal requirements; an attempt in the legislature to renew executions failed in April 2021, as a result of which executions will likely remain suspended until at least 2023.

References